Kovoor Town is a suburb of Kozhikode city on the eastern side.

Suburbs and townships
 Chevarambalam, Iringadanpalli, and  Mayanad
 Kottooli and Pottammal, Chevayur and Kavu 
 Palazhi, MLA Road and NTMC Enclave.

The Kovoor Walk
On both sides of the national highway in Kovoor Town you can find green paddy fields filled with coconut gardens on the fringes.  There is a footpath from Kovoor Town to Iringadanpalli village which takes your further to the Vellimadukunnu Hills on the Wayanad Road.  This walk can be extended up to the Poolakkadavu river and the little foot bridge leading to Parambil Bazar town.

Palazhi Road
The MLA Road from Kovoor Town connects to Palazhi  or Milky ocean village.  There is a famous Vishnu temple on the beginning of this road.  The NTMC Road, Amat Road, AKVK Colony and GKN Road originate from this road.  Residential pockets like Nellippathazham, Payyadi Meethal, Ummalathoor and Patheer Madam are in this route.  The road ends in Palazhy Junction which is on the bypass road with Hilite Mall on the other side of the road.

Chevayur Township
Chevayur is a suburban town of Kozhikode city in India. It is at a distance of 2 km from Calicut Medical College and 5 km from Kozhikode city. Chevayur is near other important residential locations like Chevarambalam, Kovoor Town and Thondayad Junction. On the southern side, Chevayur is connected by SBI Colony Road and Gas Godown Road to Palazhi and Nellikkunnu areas.  On the northern side, Chevarambalam road and Iringadanpalli Road connects Chevayur with Vellimadukunnu area on the Wayanad road.

Important landmarks
 Kozhikode Medical College
 Skincare Hospital, Chevayur
 CIGI Training Center, Chevayur  
 Presentation school and convent, Chevayur
 St. Joseph Devagiri College.
 Ravishankar School, MLA Road.
 MARK Developers Kovoor calicut

Mavoor Road after Medical College
The term Mavoor Road is used only for the 8.3 km stretch of road between Mananchira and Calicut Medical College.  The road goes another 13 km and ends in Mavoor town.  This second stretch of Mavoor Road has many important towns and villages like: 
 Peruvayal
 Perumanna
 Mavoor

See also
 
 Kuttikkattoor
 Devagiri
 Calicut Medical College
 Chevayur
 Palazhi
 Silver Hills

Location

Image gallery

References

Suburbs of Kozhikode